Clathrina camura is a species of calcareous sponge from the Atlantic Ocean.

References

Clathrina
Fauna of the Atlantic Ocean
Fauna of Norway
Animals described in 2006